Devil's Tooth may refer to:

Hydnellum peckii, a mushroom species
Devils Tooth (Idaho), a mountain in Idaho
Koko (gorilla)#Pets, a parrot Koko the gorilla was scared of
Devils tooth, a peak in Drakenstein Mountain
The Devil's Teeth, a non-fiction book
Farallon Islands, an island sometimes referred to as "Devil's Teeth"
Beyond the Devil's Teeth, a travel book